Türk Yurdu is a monthly Turkish magazine that was first published on the 30 November 1911. It was an important magazine propagating Pan-Turkism. It was founded by Yusuf Akçura, Ahmet Ağaoğlu, Ali Hüseynzade. Ziya Gökalp said: "all Turkists... met and worked together in the Türk Yurdu and Türk Ocağı ambiance." Yusuf Akçura was editor of the magazine from 1911 to 1917. From 11 April 1913, a weekly named Halka Doğru was published in Istanbul as a supplement to the Türk Yurdu. Halka Doğru closed in April 1914, but its editor, Celal Sahir, began publishing another weekly supplement to the Türk Yurdu, the Türk Sözü, on 13 April 1914. In 1917, the direction of the magazine passed to Celal Sahir, and in August 1918 Türk Yurdu was closed due to financial reasons. In 1924 it was relaunched in Ankara as an organ of the Turkish Hearths.

Notable authors
Notable writers for Türk Yurdu include:

Ömer Seyfeddin
Ahmet Aĝaoĝlu
Ziya Gökalp
Mehmet Emin Yurdakul
Ali Hüseyinzade
Mehmed Fuad Köprülü
Halide Edib

References

External links

1911 establishments in the Ottoman Empire
Magazines established in 1911
Magazines published in Ankara
Pan-Turkism
Nationalist magazines
Pan-Turkist organizations
Turkish-language magazines
Far-right politics in Turkey
Political magazines published in Turkey
Monthly magazines published in Turkey